Lepadellidae is a family of rotifers belonging to the order Ploima.

Genera
The following genera are recognised in the family Lepadellidae:
 Colurella Bory De St.Vincent, 1824 
 Halolepadella De Smet, 2015
 Lepadella Bory de St.Vincent, 1826
 Paracolurella Myers, 1936
 Squatinella Bory de St.Vincent, 1826
 Xenolepadella Hauer, 1926

References

Ploima
Rotifer families